Allan Morrison may refer to:
 Allan Morrison (footballer)
 Allan Morrison (fur trader)

See also
 Alan Morrison (disambiguation)